The São Paulo Railway Company (SPR, nickname Ingleza, transl.: The English) was a privately owned British railway company in Brazil, which operated the  gauge railway from the seaport at Santos via São Paulo to Jundiaí. The company was nationalised in 1946 and became the Estrada de Ferro Santos-Jundiaí.

The São Paulo Railway consists of three parts:
 The adhesion railway on the plateau from Paranapiacaba via São Paulo to Jundiaí

Three different systems were used to climb the steep grade between Piaçaguera and Paranapiacaba:
 A four section cable railway with stationary steam engines, in use from 1867 till 1970, called Serra Velha, transl.: Old Mountain
 A five section cable railway with stationary steam engines, in use from 1901 till 1982, called Serra Nova, transl.: New Mountain
 An electrified rack-and-adhesion railway built on the right of way of the abandoned Serra Velha opened in 1974, called Sistema Cremalheira-Aderência, transl.: System Rack-and-adhesion

Planning 

In 1859, a group of people led by the Barão de Mauá convinced the Brazilian government that it was important to construct a railroad connecting São Paulo to the seaport at Santos. The main purpose of the project was the transport of the coffee grown on the inland plateau to the Atlantic coast for export. The biggest difficulty was the task to overcome the steep east slope of the 800-meter high Serra do Mar, which was considered to be nearly impracticable. Therefore, Barão de Mauá asked England to clarify the feasibility of a railway line for locomotive hauled trains within a budget limit of 200,000 £. The greatest technician for this subject was consulted: Scottish railroad engineer James Brunlees.

Brunlees visited Brazil and considered that the project was feasible. He recommended engineer Daniel Makinson Fox to Barão de Mauá for the execution of the project. Fox was at that time only 26 years old but had already experience in the construction of railways through the mountains of northern Wales and the hillsides of the Pyrenees. An adhesion railway would have used  to overcome the slope and would have also overrun the 200,000 £ budget.

Construction 

Daniel Fox's proposal for the railway line from Santos to Jundiaí including the incline system was approved by Brunlees and the São Paulo Railway Company (SPR) was established to build the railway system and operate it for 90 years. Since the capital of the company was mainly British also the official company name was in English, not Portuguese.  The railway company contracted with Robert Sharpe & Sons to acquire the land, execute the works and supply all rolling stock and plant.

The road was constructed without explosives since it was felt that the slopes were very unstable. The rock was excavated only with plug and feathers. The line did not have any tunnels.

In spite of all the difficulties, the construction finished 10 months ahead of the date specified in the contract, which was eight years.  The São Paulo Railway was opened on 1867-02-16.

Serra Velha – the first incline system 

The part of the route climbing the Serra do Mar consisted of four 10.3% grade cable railway sections with the following length: 
 section 1:  
 section 2:  
 section 3:  
 section 4:  

At each section the wagons were attached to a steel wire rope with the help of a specially fitted brake van called Serrabreque (transl.: Hill Brake). The steel cable was driven by a stationary steam winding engine at the top end of the section, where a  extension with a 1.3% grade was also fitted, so that the wagons could be led to the next section.

The incline system was later called Serra Velha (transl.: Old Mountain) to distinguish it from the later built second incline system called Serra Nova.

Serra Nova – the second incline system 
The large volume of coffee shipments and the growth of the cities in the São Paulo region required more transport capacity. Therefore, the construction of a second incline system started in 1895. The new line ran parallel to the already existing one in about  distance. It had five sections using continuous steel wire ropes which were moved by stationary  steam engines. Two to three wagons were coupled to the rope with the help of small locomotives fitted with grip engaging with the cable. These locomotives were also able to handle the wagons in the terminal station and between the sections so that the operation of the incline system was facilitated. The locomotives have been called Locobreque (transl.: Brake locomotives). In case the weight of the wagons to be lifted was too heavy compared to the wagons lowered at the same time, tank cars filled with water were used to counterbalance the system. The incline system was used in revenue service till 1982.

Protests 

Nationalisation 
On 1946-09-13, the railroad was nationalised by the Brazilian government, and renamed the Estrada de Ferro Santos-Jundiaí, and on 1948-09-27, it was merged with most of the other Brazilian railways into the Rede Ferroviária Federal SA (RFFSA).

Sistema Cremalheira-Aderência – the Rack-and-adhesion railway
In the 1970s (well after it had been renamed), the haulage system was replaced by an Abt rack system which was installed by Japanese firm Marubeni. The locomotives for this changeover were constructed by Hitachi with the help of SLM. They work with 3 kV DC supplied by overhead lines.

See also 
 Companhia Paulista de Trens Metropolitanos
 List of funicular railways

References

External links
History of the São Paulo Railway in Portuguese
A Gateway to Brazil
The Estrada de Ferro Santos a Jundiaí
 A Very British Railway (book by Paul Catchpole)
 illustrated description of the São Paulo Railway
Fawcett, Brian, "Coffee on a Shoestring", Trains magazine (USA), June 1956 (Concise early history, and description of operations on the second incline section as it was in 1956)

Transport in São Paulo
Railway companies of Brazil
5 ft 3 in gauge railways in Brazil
Railway lines in Brazil
Rack railways in Brazil